George Cyril Herring  (May 23, 1936 – November 30, 2022) was an American historian. A specialist in the history of American foreign relations, he taught at the University of Kentucky for 36 years.

Born and raised in Blacksburg, Virginia, Herring earned his BA from Roanoke College. After serving in the United States Navy for two years, Herring attended the University of Virginia, where he earned an MA (1962) and a Ph.D. (1965) in history. Herring taught at Ohio University from 1965 until 1969, and at the University of Kentucky from 1969 until his retirement in 2005 as Alumni Professor of History. In addition to teaching and writing several books, Herring was editor of Diplomatic History, and served a member of the Department of the Army Historical Advisory Committee and President of the Society for Historians of American Foreign Relations. He also served on the boards of the Henry Clay Memorial Foundation, the Kentucky Humanities Council, and the UK Library Associates. 

Nominations of awards include: National Book Critics Circle Award for General Nonfiction, National Book Critics Circle Award for Autobiography. He was awarded the Guggenheim Fellowship for Humanities, US & Canada.

Herring died of lung cancer in Lexington, Kentucky on November 30, 2022, at the age of 86.

Books
 Aid to Russia, 1941-1946: Strategy, Diplomacy, the Origins of the Cold War (Columbia University Press, 1973)
 America's Longest War: The United States and Vietnam, 1950–1975 (John Wiley and Sons, 1979)
 The Secret Diplomacy of the Vietnam War: The Negotiating Volumes of the Pentagon Papers, editor (University of Texas Press, 1983)
 The Central American Crisis: Sources of Conflict and the Failure of U.S. Policy, co-editor with Kenneth M. Coleman (Scholarly Resources, 1985)
 Modern American Diplomacy co-editor with John M. Carroll (Scholarly Resources, 1986)
 The Pentagon Papers: Abridged Edition, editor (McGraw-Hill, 1993)
 LBJ and Vietnam: A Different Kind of War (University of Texas Press, 1994)
 From Colony to Superpower: U.S. Foreign Relations Since 1776 (Oxford University Press, 2008)

References

1936 births
2022 deaths
University of Virginia alumni
21st-century American historians
21st-century American male writers
People from Blacksburg, Virginia
Historians from Virginia
American male non-fiction writers